The Women's Soviet Chess Championship was played in the Soviet Union from 1927 through 1991 to determine the women's chess national champion.

The championship was not played on a regular basis in the years 1927–1937 and there was a break during World War II. From 1950 onward it was played regularly all years.

List of winners
{| class="wikitable"
!  #  !!  Year  !! Place !! Winner !! Score 
|-
|  1 || 1927  ||  Moscow ||  Olga Rubtsova ||  8½  / 10     
|-
|  2 || 1931 ||  Moscow ||   Olga Rubtsova ||  7½  / 9     
|-
|  3 || 1934 ||  Leningrad ||  Olga Semenova Tyan-Shanskaya  ||  7 / 9     
|-
|  4 || 1936 ||  Leningrad  ||   Olga Semenova Tyan-Shanskaya ||  9½  / 11      
|-
|  5 || 1937 ||  Rostov-on-Don  ||   Olga Rubtsova || 12½  / 15       
|-
|  6 || 1945 ||  Moscow ||   Valentina Borisenko || 7½  / 9       
|-
|  7 ||  1946||  Moscow  ||   Elisaveta Bykova || 14 / 16     
|-
|  8 || 1947 ||  Moscow ||  Elisaveta Bykova || 12 / 15      
|-
|  9 || 1948 ||  Moscow ||  Olga Rubtsova || 13 / 17     
|-
| 10 || 1950 ||  Riga ||  Elisaveta Bykova || 12½  / 15     
|-
| 11 || 1951||  Kiev ||  Kira Zvorykina  || 11½  / 17      
|-
| 12 || 1952 ||  Tbilisi ||  Lyudmila Rudenko || 13 / 17    
|-
| 13 || 1953 ||  Rostov-on-Don ||  Kira Zvorykina ||  13 / 17      
|-
| 14 || 1954 ||  Krasnodar ||  Larissa Volpert || 14 / 19       
|-
| 15 || 1955 ||  Sukhumi ||  Valentina Borisenko || 13½  / 19     
|-
| 16 || 1956 ||  Dnepropetrovsk ||  Kira Zvorykina || 13½  / 17     
|-
| 17 || 1957 ||  Vilnius ||  Valentina Borisenko  || 12 / 17     
|-
| 18 || 1958 ||  Kharkov ||  Larissa Volpert || 14 / 21      
|-
| 19 || 1959 ||  Lipetsk ||  Larissa Volpert || 12 / 18     
|-
| 20 || 1960 ||  Riga ||  Valentina Borisenko || 13 / 18      
|-
| 21 || 1961 ||  Baku ||  Valentina Borisenko || 13½  / 19     
|-
| 22 || 1962||  Riga ||  Tatiana Zatulovskaya || 13 / 19     
|-
| 23 || 1963 ||  Baku  ||  Maaja Ranniku   || 14 / 19      
|-
| 24 || 1964 ||  Tbilisi ||  Nona Gaprindashvili || 15 / 19     
|-
| 25 || 1965 ||  Beltsy ||  Valentina Kozlovskaya || 13½  / 19      
|-
| 26 || 1966 ||  Kiev ||  Nana Alexandria|| 14 / 19     
|-
| 27 || 1967 ||  Sochi ||  Maaja Ranniku || 11 / 13      
|-
| 28 || 1968 ||  Ashkhabad ||  Nana Alexandria || 13½  / 19      
|-
| 29 || 1969 ||  Gori ||  Nana Alexandria || 15 / 19     
|-
| 30 || 1970 ||  Beltsy ||  Alla Kushnir|| 14 / 19     
|-
| 31 || 1971 ||  Sochi ||  Irina Levitina || 14 / 19     
|-
| 32 || 1972 ||  Tolyatti ||  Marta Litinskaya|| 12 / 19     
|-
| 33 || 1973 ||  Tbilisi ||  Nona Gaprindashvili  || 14 / 19      
|-
| 34 || 1974 ||  Tbilisi ||   Elena Fatalibekova || 14 / 18      
|-
| 35 || 1975 ||  Frunze || Liudmila Belavenets || 10 / 16     
|-
| 36 || 1976 ||  Tbilisi || Anna Akhsharumova || 12½  / 17    
|-
| 37 || 1977 ||  Lvov || Maia Chiburdanidze ||13 / 17    
|-
| 38 || 1978 ||  Nikolayevsk || Lidia Semenova || 12½  / 17     
|-
| 39 || 1979 ||  Tbilisi || Irina Levitina ||12½  / 17        
|-
| 40 || 1980 ||  Alma-Ata || Irina Levitina || 12 / 15       
|-
| 41 || 1981 ||  Ivano-Frankivsk   || Nona Gaprindashvili   Nana Ioseliani || 12 / 17     
|-
| 42 || 1982 ||  Tallinn || Nana Ioseliani || 12 / 17     
|-
| 43 || 1983 ||  Vilnius || Nona Gaprindashvili || 12½  / 17    
|-
| 44 || 1984 ||  Kiev || Svetlana Matveeva   Anna Akhsharumova || 9½  / 15     
|-
| 45 || 1985 ||  Yerevan || Nona Gaprindashvili  || 12½  / 17    
|-
| 46 || 1986 ||  Frunze || Nana Ioseliani || 11½  / 16    
|-
| 47 || 1987 ||  Tbilisi || Nana Ioseliani || 14½  / 19    
|-
| 48 || 1988 ||  Alma-Ata || Julia Demina || 12 / 17    
|-
| 49 || 1989 ||  Volzhsky  || Irina Chelushkina || 12½  / 17    
|-
| 50 || 1990 ||  Podolsk  || Ketevan Arakhamia-Grant || 13 / 16    
|-
| 51 || 1991 ||  Lvov || Svetlana Matveeva || 13½  / 17     
|-
|}

Winners of more titles
 5 titles : Valentina Borisenko, Nona Gaprindashvili 
 4 titles : Olga Rubtsova, Nana Ioseliani
 3 titles : Nana Alexandria, Elisaveta Bykova, Irina Levitina, Larissa Volpert, Kira Zvorykina 
 2 titles : Anna Akhsharumova, Svetlana Matveeva, Maaja Ranniku, Olga Semenova Tyan-Shanskaya

Notes

Related pages
 Soviet Chess Championship

Chess national championships
Women's chess national championships
Championship
chess
Recurring sporting events established in 1927
Recurring events disestablished in 1991
1927 establishments in the Soviet Union
1991 disestablishments in the Soviet Union